Punadra is a town in the Gandhinagar district of Gujarat in Western India.

History 
Punadra was a Fourth Class princely state and taluka, comprising ten more villages, covering eleven square miles in Mahi Kantha Agency and ruled by Makwana Koli chieftains of Jhala Dynasty having Thakor title during the British Raj under the colonial Mahi Kantha Agency. The Koli rulers of Punadra were converted to Islam by Mahmud Begada. They are brothers of Dabha State, Ramas State and Khadal State. 

It had a combined population of 2,662 in 1901, yielding a state revenue of 15,598 Rupees (mostly from land), paying a tribute of 375 Rupees to the Gaekwad Baroda State.

Places of interest 
The village has an old fort from the time of Mahmud Begada (1459–1511).

References 

Cities and towns in Gandhinagar district

External links 
 The Imperial Gazetteer of India, Volume 7